Abdoulaye Conde (born 1 February 2002) is a Guinean professional footballer who plays as a midfielder for Dibba Al Fujairah.

References

External links 
 
 

2002 births
Living people
Sportspeople from Conakry
Guinean footballers
Association football midfielders
Guinean expatriate footballers
Guinean expatriate sportspeople in Belarus
Expatriate footballers in Belarus
Expatriate footballers in the United Arab Emirates
FC Isloch Minsk Raion players
Dibba FC players
Belarusian Premier League players